Eknath Dinesh Kerkar (born 10 September 1993) is an Indian cricketer. He made his Twenty20 debut for Mumbai in the 2014–15 Syed Mushtaq Ali Trophy on 18 January 2016. He made his first-class debut for Mumbai in the 2018–19 Ranji Trophy on 14 December 2018. He made his List A debut on 20 February 2021, for Goa in the 2020–21 Vijay Hazare Trophy.

References

External links
 
 

1993 births
Living people
Indian cricketers
Goa cricketers
Mumbai cricketers
Cricketers from Mumbai